Robert "Showtime" Turner, Jr. (March 22, 1971 – May 19, 1991) was an American college football player.

Turner was born on March 22, 1971, in Vicksburg, Mississippi to Robert and Ruby Turner. He played quarterback for the Port Gibson High School Blue Waves; later he gained acclaim as a defensive back for Jackson State University. He earned Division I-AA All America and All-Southwestern Athletic Conference Honors in 1990.

After a breakout season, Turner was shot on Sunday, May 19, 1991, outside a nightclub in Port Gibson.

References

External links
 
 
 

1971 births
1991 deaths
Sportspeople from Vicksburg, Mississippi
African-American players of American football
Players of American football from Mississippi
American football defensive backs
Jackson State Tigers football players
Deaths by firearm in Mississippi
20th-century African-American sportspeople
Murdered African-American people
People murdered in Mississippi
Male murder victims